Immediate mode is an API design pattern  in computer graphics libraries, in which
 the client calls directly cause rendering of graphics objects to the display, or in which
 the data to describe rendering primitives is inserted frame by frame directly from the client into a command list (in the case of immediate mode primitive rendering),
without the use of extensive indirection – thus immediate – to retained resources. It does not preclude the use of double-buffering.

Retained mode is an alternative approach. Historically, retained mode has been the dominant style in GUI libraries; however, both can coexist in the same library and are not necessarily exclusive in practice.

Overview 

In immediate mode, the scene (complete object model of the rendering primitives) is retained in the memory space of the client, instead of the graphics library. This implies that in an immediate mode application the lists of graphical objects to be rendered are kept by the client and are not saved by the graphics library API. The application must re-issue all drawing commands required to describe the entire scene each time a new frame is required, regardless of actual changes. This method provides on the one hand a maximum of control and flexibility to the application program, but on the other hand it also generates continuous work load on the CPU.

Examples of immediate mode rendering systems include Direct2D, OpenGL 
and Quartz. There are some immediate mode GUIs that are particularly suitable when used in conjunction with immediate mode rendering systems.

Immediate mode primitive rendering 

Primitive vertex attribute data may be inserted frame by frame into a command buffer by a rendering API. This involves significant bandwidth and processor time (especially if the graphics processing unit is on a separate bus), but may be advantageous for data generated dynamically by the CPU. It is less common since the advent of increasingly versatile shaders, with which a graphics processing unit may generate increasingly complex effects without the need for CPU intervention.

Immediate mode rendering with vertex buffers 

Although drawing commands have to be re-issued for each new frame, modern systems using this method are generally able to avoid the unnecessary duplication of more memory-intensive display data by referring to that unchanging data (via indirection) (e.g. textures and vertex buffers) in the drawing commands.

See also 

 Immediate mode GUI
 Display list
 Retained mode, usually contrasted with immediate mode
 Scene graph

References 

Computer graphics
OpenGL
DirectX